Myron Nathan "Joe" Ginsberg (October 11, 1926 – November 2, 2012) was an American professional baseball player. A catcher, he played for seven Major League Baseball teams: the Detroit Tigers (1948 and 1950–53), Cleveland Indians (1953–54), Kansas City Athletics (1956), Baltimore Orioles (1956–60), Chicago White Sox (1960–61), Boston Red Sox (1961) and New York Mets (1962).

Early life
Ginsberg was Jewish. He was born in Manhattan, and attended Cooley High School in Detroit, Michigan.

Baseball career
In his 13 MLB seasons he played in 695 games (520 of them for the Tigers and Orioles), and had 1,716 at bats, 168 runs, 414 hits, 59 doubles, eight triples, 20 home runs, 182 RBIs, seven stolen bases, 226 walks, a .241 batting average, .332 on-base percentage, 17 sacrifice hits, 13 sacrifice flies and nine intentional walks.

As a Tiger, Ginsberg caught the first of Virgil Trucks' two no-hitters on the 1952 season, on May 15.

Death
Ginsberg died on November 2, 2012, in West Bloomfield, Michigan, at the age of 86.

References

External links

Encyclopedia of Baseball Catchers

1926 births
2012 deaths
21st-century American Jews
Baltimore Orioles players
Baseball players from Detroit
Boston Red Sox players
Chicago White Sox players
Cleveland Indians players
Cooley High School alumni
Denver Bears players
Detroit Tigers players
Indianapolis Indians players
Jamestown Falcons players
Jewish American baseball players
Jewish Major League Baseball players
Kansas City Athletics players
Major League Baseball catchers
New York Mets players
Seattle Rainiers players
Sportspeople from Manhattan
Baseball players from New York City
Toledo Mud Hens players
Williamsport Tigers players